is a female idol music group created in July 2003. It is composed today of three members: Nao, Megu and Kaede. The group is from Niigata, Japan, and was created for the promotion of the local green onion (Allium fistulosum): the word  means "green onion" in Japanese. "Negicco" thus means "The green onion girls". The group is produced by Negi-pro Agency, and is signed to the T-Palette Records label. The single "Tokimeki no Headliner" number 20 on the weekly Oricon Singles Chart in November 2013 and Hikari no Spur reached the fifth place.

Members 
Current members
 
 
 

Former members

Discography

Albums 
Mini-albums
 ??/??/2009 : 
 09/07/2010 : 
 20/07/2011 : Get It On!

Compilation
 22/02/2012 : Negicco 2003-2012 ~Best~

Studio albums
 17/07/2013 : Melody Palette
 20/01/2015 : Rice & Snow
 24/05/2016 : Tea For Three
 10/07/2018 : My Color

Singles 
 27/10/2004 : 
 25/01/2006 : Falling Stars
 ??/??/2006 : 
 ??/??/2007 : Earth
 ??/??/2008 : Summer Breeze
 ??/??/2008 : 
 10/09/2010 : 
 02/11/2011 : 
 20/06/2012 : 
 13/02/2013 : 
 29/05/2013 : 
 06/11/2013 : 
 02/12/2014 : 
 16/04/2014 : {{Nihongo|Triple! Wonderland'|トリプル!WONDERLAND}}
 22/07/2014 : 
 11/08/2015 : 
 29/03/2016 : 
 20/12/2016 : 
 06/02/2018 : 
 24/09/2019 : I LOVE YOUR LOVE 25/08/2020 : 

Featured Single
 21/03/2012 :  ("Negicco × hy4_4yh")
 26/08/2014 : Girl's Life'' (as Negipecia, a collaboration with Especia)

References

External links 
  Official website

Japanese girl groups
Musical groups established in 2003
2003 establishments in Japan
Culture in Niigata Prefecture
Musical groups from Niigata Prefecture